Aglaia Szyszkowitz (born 11 January 1968) is an Austrian  actress. She has appeared in more than seventy films since 1995.

Filmography

Film

References

External links 

1968 births
Living people
Austrian film actresses